The Saratoga and Schenectady Railroad was incorporated on February 16, 1831. The founders were Henry Walton, John Clarke, William A. Langworthy, John H.
Steele, Miles Beach, Gideon W. Davison, and Rockwell Putnam. The Rensselaer and Saratoga Railroad leased the line on January 1, 1851, and the lease was reassigned to the Delaware and Hudson Canal Company on May 1, 1871.

Initially most of the business of the line was passenger travel in the summer.  It lost money until the Rensselaer and Saratoga Railroad and the Saratoga and Washington railroad linked it into a continuous line between the Hudson River and Lake Champlain by 1848.

Rail trails 

Much of the original right-of-way has been abandoned and adapted for recreation.

 The Ballston Veterans Bike Trail runs for  along the west shore of Ballston Lake in the town of Ballston.
Since 2005 the James Tedisco Fitness Trail follows the route of the Saratoga and Schenectady for approximately  through the village of Ballston Spa from Front Street to Prospect Street.

References

Schenectady, New York
Saratoga County, New York
Defunct New York (state) railroads
Predecessors of the Delaware and Hudson Railway
Railway companies established in 1831

Passenger rail transportation in New York (state)
American companies established in 1831